Agnes Duncan MBE (10 November 1899 – 1996) was a Scottish singer and choral conductor. Her Scottish Junior Singers won the leading BBC choral competition on two occasions.

Life 
Duncan was born in Alexandria in West Dunbartonshire. and she was singing in Vale of Leven children’s choir, with her elder sister, when she was ten.

She became the contralto soloist of Glasgow Cathedral Choir.

She formed the Scottish Junior Singers in 1943. It was launched on credit and it had 60 singers.

In 1952 she conducted at the Edinburgh International Festival.

In 1958 Duncan's choir had won the children's and the youth class of the BBC radio's Let the People Sing choral competition. which were held in the Royal Festival Hall. In 1961 Agnes Duncan's choir again won the children's and the youth class.

In 1967 Duncan was rewarded with an MBE in recognition of her contribution to music.

Death and legacy 
In 1989 the Agnes Duncan Trophy was created by the Soroptimist International's Glasgow Club to mark Agnes Duncan’s 90th Birthday.  The Trophy, and a cheque for £100 is awarded to the best soloist, under 18, at the Glasgow Music Festival.

References 

1899 births
1996 deaths
People from Alexandria, West Dunbartonshire
Scottish singers